was a feudal domain under the Tokugawa shogunate of Edo period Japan, in Harima Province in what is now the southwestern portion of modern-day Hyōgo Prefecture. It was centered around Tatsuno Castle which was located in what is now the city of Tatsuno, Hyōgo. It was controlled by a cadet branch fudai daimyō Niwa clan throughout its history.

History
At the start of the Edo period, the area around Tatsuno was part of the vast holdings of the Ikeda clan of Himeji Domain. In 1617, Ikeda Mitsumasa was transferred to Tottori Domain and his former estates were divided. A son-in-law of Tokugawa Ieyasu, Honda Tadamasa received a 150,000 koku portion centered on Himeji Castle. Tadamasa's younger son, Honda Masatomo, was transferred from Ōtaki Domain in Kazusa Province and given a 50,000 koku domain at Tatsuno. He reconstructed Tatsuno Castle and its castle town. On the death of his brother Honda Tadatoki of Himeji Domain in 1626, he was transferred to Himeji, and replaced at Tatsuno by his cousin, Ogasawara Nagatsugu, who also received an additional 10,000 koku to take care of Senhime, the widow of Honda Tadaoki and daughter of Tokugawa Ieyasu. After brief periods under the Okabe clan and Kyōgoku clan, the domain was assigned to the Wakisaka Yasumasa, formerly of Iida Domain in Shinano Province. The Wakisaka would continue to rule the domain until the Meiji Restoration. Wakizaka Yasumasa received permission from the shogunate to rebuild Tatsuno Castle. The 8th daimyo, Wakasaka Yasutada had a very long tenure, and served as Jisha-bugyō and rōjū in the shogunal administration. A very capable ruler, he reformed the domain's finances and also established a han school. The domain developed soy sauce as a major cash commodity. His successor, Wakisaka Yasunori, served as Kyoto Shoshidai, and also as rōjū. During the Bakumatsu period, the domain was initially a strong supporter of the shogunate. However, under WakisakaYasuaya, the domain forces stopped at the border of Ako district, and refused to proceed further during th Second Chōshū expedition. By the start of the Boshin War, the domain had changed fealty to the new Meiji government and fought against the shogunate in Echigo Province and other locations.  In 1871, with the abolition of the han system, the domain became "Tatsuno Prefecture", which was merged with "Shikama Prefecture", which in turn became part of Hyōgo Prefecture.

The Wakisaka clan was ennobled with the kazoku peerage title of shishaku (viscount) in 1884.

Holdings at the end of the Edo period
As with most domains in the han system, Tatsuno Domain consisted of several discontinuous territories calculated to provide the assigned kokudaka, based on periodic cadastral surveys and projected agricultural yields.

Harima Province 
4 villages in Shikisai District
68 villages in Ittō District
62 villages in Issai District
Mimasaka Province
11 villages in Aida District
5 villages in Mashima District

List of daimyō 

{| class=wikitable
! #||Name || Tenure || Courtesy title || Court Rank || kokudaka 
|-
|colspan=6|  Honda clan, 1617-1626 (Fudai)
|-
||1||||1617 - 1626||Kai-no-kami (甲斐守)|| Junior 5th Rank, Lower Grade (従五位下)||50,000 koku
|-
|colspan=6|  Ogasawara clan, 1626-1632 (Fudai)
|-
||1||||1626 - 1632||Shinano-no-kami (信濃守)|| Junior 5th Rank, Lower Grade (従五位下)||60,000 koku
|-
|colspan=6|  tenryō　1632-1633
|-
|colspan=6|  Okabe clan, 1633-1635 (Fudai)
|-
||1||||1633 - 1635||Shinano-no-kami (美濃守)|| Junior 5th Rank, Lower Grade (従五位下)||53,000 koku
|-
|colspan=6|  tenryō　1635-1637
|-
|colspan=6|  Kyōgoku clan, 1637-1658 (Tozama)
|-
|1||||1637 - 1658||Gyobu-taiyu (刑部大輔)|| Junior 5th Rank, Lower Grade (従五位下)||60,000 koku
|-
|colspan=6|  tenryō　1658-1672
|-
|colspan=6|  Wakisaka clan, 1672-1871 (Tozama -> Fudai)
|-
||1||||1672 - 1684||Nakatsukasa-shoyu (中務少輔)|| Junior 5th Rank, Lower Grade (従五位下)||53,000 koku
|-
||2||||1684 - 1709||Awaji-no-kami (淡路守)|| Junior 5th Rank, Lower Grade (従五位下)||53,000 -> 51,000 koku
|-
||3||||1709 - 1722||Awaji-no-kami (淡路守)|| Junior 5th Rank, Lower Grade (従五位下)|| 51,000 koku
|-
||4||||1722 - 1747||Nakatsukasa-shoyu (中務少輔); Awaji-no-kami (淡路守)|| Junior 5th Rank, Lower Grade (従五位下)|| 51,000 koku
|-
||5||||1747 - 1757||Nakatsukasa-shoyu (中務少輔)|| Junior 5th Rank, Lower Grade (従五位下)|| 51,000 koku
|-
||6||||1757 - 1759||Ise-no-kami (伊勢守)|| Junior 5th Rank, Lower Grade (従五位下)||51,000 koku
|-
||7||||1759 - 1784||Awaji-no-kami (淡路守); Zusho-no-kami (図書頭)|| Junior 5th Rank, Lower Grade (従五位下)|| 51,000 koku
|-
||8||||1784 - 1841||Nakatsukasa-daiyu (中務大輔); Jijū (侍従)|| Junior 4th Rank, Lower Grade (従四位下)|| 51,000 koku
|-
||9||||1841 - 1862||Nakatsukasa-daiyu (中務大輔); Jijū (侍従)|| Junior 4th Rank, Lower Grade (従四位下)|| 51,000 koku
|-
||10||||1862 - 1871||Awaji-no-kami (淡路守)|| Junior 5th Rank, Lower Grade (従五位下)|| 51,000 koku
|-
|}

See also 
 List of Han
 Abolition of the han system

Further reading
 Bolitho, Harold. (1974). Treasures Among Men: The Fudai Daimyo in Tokugawa Japan. New Haven: Yale University Press.  ;  OCLC 185685588

References

Domains of Japan
1617 establishments in Japan
States and territories established in 1617
1871 disestablishments in Japan
States and territories disestablished in 1871
Harima Province
Domains of Hyōgo Prefecture